The 1st constituency of the Landes (French: Première circonscription des Landes) is a French legislative constituency in Landes département. Like the other 576 French constituencies, it elects one MP using the two-round system, with a run-off if no candidate receives over 50% of the vote in the first round.

Description
The constituency covers the north of the department.

Deputies

Election results

2022

 
 
 
 
 
 
 
 
|-
| colspan="8" bgcolor="#E9E9E9"|
|-

2017

2012

References

External links 
Results of legislative elections since 1958

1